was a Fukui Railway Fukubu Line railway station located in Fukui, Fukui Prefecture, Japan. It was the predecessor of Fukui-eki Station, located in front of Fukui Station.

History
On October 15, 1933 Fukui-Ekimae Station opened to the public. Fukui-Ekimae Station closed and was relocated as Fukui-eki Station to the square in front of the west station building of Fukui Station.

Services
All Fukubu Line trains served Fukui-Ekimae station.  Fukui-Ekimae Station was a single platform located approximately 150 meters west of Fukui Station in the median of Densha-dōri. A roof and incline were added after the introduction of low-floor trains and disabled access improvements.

Surrounding area
Densha-dōri passes through Fukui's main downtown shopping area. The road and arcades on either side were under construction until March 2006, when an underground parking deck was completed.

Transfers
JR and Echizen Railway Fukui Station was located approximately 150 meters to the east; the Echizen Railway terminal was on the eastern side of the JR West station.

References

Railway stations in Japan opened in 1933
Railway stations in Fukui Prefecture
Fukui Railway Fukubu Line

ja:福井駅前駅